Parliamentary elections were held in France on 13 and 14 May 1849. Voters elected the first National Assembly of the Second Republic. The conservative Party of Order won an overall majority of 450 seats. The Party of Order was a bourgeois, traditionalist, and conservative party opposed to the Presidency of Louis Napoleon Bonaparte and the subsequent 1851 coup.

Results

References

French Second Republic
Legislative elections in France
France
Legislative